Guy Henderson Orcutt (July 5, 1917 – March 5, 2006) was an American econometrician. He was a long-time faculty member at the University of Wisconsin–Madison, and is known for developing the Cochrane–Orcutt estimation procedure.

A native of Michigan, Orcutt earned his bachelor's, master's and doctorate degree from the University of Michigan.

In 1959 he was elected as a Fellow of the American Statistical Association.

References

External links

1917 births
2006 deaths
20th-century American economists
Distinguished Fellows of the American Economic Association
Fellows of the American Statistical Association
Fellows of the Econometric Society
Harvard University faculty
Time series econometricians
University of Michigan alumni
University of Wisconsin–Madison faculty